Lāčplēsis Day is a memorial day for soldiers who fought for the independence of Latvia. It is celebrated on November 11th, marking the decisive victory by the Latvian Army over the West Russian Volunteer Army – a joint Russian-German volunteer force led by the warlord Pavel Bermondt-Avalov – at the 1919 Battle of Riga during the Latvian War of Independence, thus safeguarding the independence of the nascent nation. It initially was a day of honoring the 743 soldiers that fell in the battles around the Riga area.

The Latvian War of Independence (1918-1919) 
The Republic of Latvia was proclaimed on November 18, 1918 by the People's Council of Latvia at the city of Riga. The territory of Latvia had been overrun by the army of the German Empire. After the end of World War I, the German empire army stationed in Latvia was ordered by Allied forces to work with the Latvian army to defend against the Bolshevik invasion of December 1918. The German army soon turned against the Latvians in April 1919, hoping to make Latvia subject to Germany. The Estonian Army including the North Latvian Brigade defeated the German forces at Cēsis in June 1919. Former soldiers of the German Empire and Russian Empire regrouped and reinvaded Latvia in the fall of 1919. The outnumbered Latvian Army fought valiantly and was victorious on November 11, 1919. Latvia signed a peace treaty with Russia on August 11, 1920, finalizing the Latvian success in their Wars for Independence.

Creation of Lāčplēsis Day 
After the West Russian Volunteer Army was pushed out of Riga, writer Karlis Skalbe, a Latvian writer, compared the fighting spirit of the Latvian Armed Forces against the German/Russian volunteer army to the "spirit of Lāčplēsis". Lāčplēsis directly translates to "bearslayer" in English and was a highly regarded symbolic figure in Latvian culture. The Constitutional Assembly of Latvia created the Order of Lāčplēsis soon after to commemorate instrumental figures in the Latvian victory over the invaders. On November 11, 1920, the first solemn awarding ceremony of the Lāčplēsis War Orders took place on the Esplanade Park in Riga, in which the Chairman of the Constitutional Assembly Jānis Čakste presented orders to the first 288 Knights of the Order. These 288 Knights were mainly soldiers and instructors who fought bravely against the invading Germans and Russians to secure independence. 

On November 1, 1928, the Order of Lāčplēsis was ceased to be awarded, and Lāčplēsis Day became a massive army holiday, celebrated by army garrisons through parades, feasts, concerts, and solemn events. The "knights" of the war order and injured/disabled in combat were especially honored during the Lāčplēsis Day festivities. These annual parades on the 11th of November went on for 20 years before the USSR invaded and occupied Latvia.

Lāčplēsis Day after USSR occupation (1988) 
After Soviet occupation of Latvia in 1940, the celebration of Lāčplēsis Day was strictly prohibited. During the third awakening of Latvia, the Latvian Soviet Socialist Republic resumed the celebration of Lāčplēsis Day. On November 10, 1989, the Supreme Council of the LSSR designated Lāčplēsis Day as a day of remembrance. Lāčplēsis Day became a day of commemoration for the soldiers that gave their lives during the Latvian War of Independence. A popular Lāčplēsis Day tradition since 1988 has been placing candles by the wall of Riga Castle. Similar candle-lighting ceremonies also take place in other cities, villages and military cemeteries across the country. In 2018 there has been a proposal by Unity and National Alliance to make Lāčplēsis Day a national holiday. Lāčplēsis Day now honors all fallen Latvian freedom fighters, not just the Knights of the Lāčplēsis War Order. November has become a symbolic month of Latvian reflection on the founding of their relatively young nation. Latvian officials frequently mention Lāčplēsis Day to rally Latvians in various modern conflicts. Given the COVID-19 pandemic ongoing in 2021, Latvian President Egils Levits tweeted "Let's remember our own Lāčplēsis heroes, Latvian Army soldiers who sacrificed their lives for their homeland. Today we must find the strength of Lāčplēsis to fight for the health of the people, in order to resist delusions." Levits encourages his citizens to make wise and sacrifical decisions regarding the global pandemic, drawing upon the strength of the Knights of Lāčplēsis.

See also
Lāčplēsis
Order of Lāčplēsis
Proclamation Day of the Republic of Latvia

References

External links 

What is 'Lāčplēsis Day' and why do Latvians mark it? November 10, 2020. Public Broadcasting of Latvia. Retrieved July 31, 2021.
Today is the Lāčplēsis Day! What does 11 November mean for Latvia?. November 11, 2016. Ministry of Foreign Affairs of the Republic of Latvia. Retrieved November 17, 2016.
What is Lāčplēša Day. Infogr.am. Retrieved November 8, 2016.
Five of the most emotional 11 November speeches of Latvian officials.  November 14, 2015. Baltic News Network. Retrieved November 8, 2016.

Public holidays in Latvia
November observances
Autumn events in Latvia
Independence of Latvia